London Lakes is a rural locality in the local government area (LGA) of Central Highlands in the Central LGA region of Tasmania. The 2016 census recorded a population of nil for the state suburb of London Lakes.

History 
London Lakes is a confirmed locality.

Geography
The Serpentine River (not the one in south-west Tasmania) forms part of the western boundary. The locality contains Lake Big Jim, Lake Samuel, Highland Waters and almost all of Lake Echo.

Road infrastructure 
Route C173 (Victoria Valley Road) runs through from south-west to south.

See also
 Lake Echo Power Station

References

Towns in Tasmania
Localities of Central Highlands Council